Husainganj is a constituency of the Uttar Pradesh Legislative Assembly covering the city of Husainganj in the Fatehpur district of Uttar Pradesh, India.

Husainganj is one of six assembly constituencies in the Fatehpur Lok Sabha constituency. Since 2008, this assembly constituency is numbered 242 amongst 403 constituencies.

Wards/Areas
It contains these parts of Fatehpur district:
Husainganj of Fatehpur Tehsil;
Airayan, Hathagaon & Kotala of Khaga Tehsil

Members of the Legislative Assembly

Election results

2022

2017

References

External links
 

Assembly constituencies of Uttar Pradesh
Fatehpur district